Kiattisak Toopkhuntod (born 19 February 1995) is a Thai professional footballer who plays as a centre back.

Honours

International
Thailand U-23
 Dubai Cup (1) :  2017

References

External links

Living people
1995 births
Kiattisak Toopkhuntod
Association football defenders
Kiattisak Toopkhuntod
Kiattisak Toopkhuntod
Kiattisak Toopkhuntod